Babadaýhan (from Persian بابادهقان Bâbâdehqân/Bābā-Dihqān) is a city and capital of Babadaýhan District in the Ahal Province of  Turkmenistan.  During the Soviet period, it was named Kirovsk in honor of Sergei Kirov. Its name and the name of the surrounding district were changed on 26 June 1992 by Parliamentary Resolution No. 729-XII.

Populated places in Ahal Region